Judith Patricia 'Pat' Symons (1935-1987), was a female swimmer who competed for England.

Swimming career
She represented England and won a silver medal in the 110 yards backstroke at the 1954 British Empire and Commonwealth Games in Vancouver, Canada.

She was a member of the Northumberland Amateur Swimming Club and was England's swimmer of the year in 1954. She also won a bronze medal in the 100 metres backstroke at the 1954 European Aquatics Championships and at the ASA National British Championships she won the 110 yards backstroke title in 1954.

References

1935 births
1987 deaths
English female swimmers
Commonwealth Games medallists in swimming
Commonwealth Games silver medallists for England
Swimmers at the 1954 British Empire and Commonwealth Games
Medallists at the 1954 British Empire and Commonwealth Games